Yamaşirmä (Yamaşirmä) is a rural locality (a selo) in Vysokogorsky District, Tatarstan. The population was 1126 as of 2010.

 is located 25 km east of Zheleznodorozhnoy stantsii Vysokaya Gora, district's administrative centre, and 46 km northeast of Kazan, republic's capital, by road.

The earliest known record of the settlement dates from the 16th century. It forms part of the district since 1965.

There are 22 streets in the village.

References

External links 
 

Rural localities in Vysokogorsky District